Cadherin-6 is a protein that in humans is encoded by the CDH6 gene.

This gene encodes a type II classical cadherin from the cadherin superfamily. The encoded membrane protein is a calcium dependent cell–cell adhesion glycoprotein composed of five extracellular cadherin repeats, a transmembrane region and a highly conserved cytoplasmic tail. Cadherins mediate cell–cell binding in a homophilic manner, contributing to the sorting of heterogeneous cell types and the maintenance of orderly structures such as epithelium. Strong transcriptional expression of this gene has been observed in hepatocellular and renal carcinoma cell lines, suggesting a possible role in metastasis and invasion.

References

Further reading

External links